Count Giammaria Mazzuchelli (or Giovanni Maria Mazzucchelli) (28 November 1707 – 19 November 1765) was an Italian writer, bibliographer and historian.

Biography

Mazzuchelli was the son of Count Federico Mazzuchelli (it., Brescia, 1671–1746) and Margaret Muzzi. Due to poor health during early childhood, he studied at first with a private tutor. He continued his studies in Bologna, where he studied under Francesco Saverio Quadrio, and later in Padua, where he studied under Domenico Lazzarini, where he graduated in 1728. In the same year, he married Barbara Chizzoli, an heiress whose dowry allowed him to devote himself to historical studies. Mazzucchelli's father bought the Moggi's sixteenth-century family house, located between Brescia and Lake Garda, in 1722, and added the central building and the west wing some time later. Giammaria completed the construction in 1753, as stated on the memorial tablet set between the pronaos' central door architrave and the tympanum.

Works

He began with numerous scholarly and accurate biographies of ancient and more modern authors, e.g., Archimedes, Pietro Aretino, Lodovico Adimari, Luigi Alamanni, Matteo and Filippo Villani). From this experience, he conceived an ambitious plan to collect biographies of all the writers of Italy from the earliest times, including the history of their works. In this endeavor, he relied on the Queriniana library in Brescia, donated by the Cardinal Angelo Maria Quirini, and his extensive correspondence with the scholars of Italy and Europe. He began to compile a dictionary of great writers of Italy, but the work remained unfinished because of his untimely death. However, Mazzuchelli opened the way to the history of Italian literature, recognized by Girolamo Tiraboschi in the Introduction of his greatest work, and subsequent historians. Much of Mazzuchelli's unpublished material is still in manuscript form in the Vatican Library. A copy is also in the collection of the Biblioteca Nazionale Centrale di Roma.

Notes

References
 "Mazzuchelli (Count Giovanni Maria)." In: Louis-Maïeul Chaudon, Nouvelle Dictionnaire Historique, Michele Morelli, 1791. Volume XVII, pp. 407–410 (Google Books)

1707 births
1765 deaths
Writers from Brescia
Italian biographers
Male biographers
Italian male non-fiction writers
18th-century Italian male writers
18th-century Italian historians
Italian bibliographers